Aparecida is a Brazilian municipality in the state of São Paulo. It is located in the fertile valley of the River Paraíba do Sul on the southern (right) bank. It is part of the Metropolitan Region of Vale do Paraíba e Litoral Norte. The population is 36,185 (2020 est.) in an area of 121.08 km². The municipality is sometimes referred as Aparecida do Norte.

History
Once part of the municipality of Guaratinguetá, it was emancipated in 1928.

Geography
Aparecida is located 168 km northeast of São Paulo and 240 km west of Rio de Janeiro.

With an average altitude of 544 meters, and elevations varying from 525 to 620 meters, Aparecida has a hot climate with dry winters. Recorded temperatures are a maximum of 35 °C, a minimum of -1 °C and an average of 22 °C.

Main sights
It is home to and named after the Basilica of the National Shrine of Our Lady of Aparecida, the patron saint of Brazil, declared so by Pope Pius XI in 1929. Pope Benedict XVI delivered a speech here in May, 2007.

It now depends exclusively on tourism generated by the devotees surrounding the statue of the Virgin. Aparecida receives more than 7 million tourists a year making it the most popular religious pilgrimage site in Latin America.

These pilgrims come to visit the Basilica containing the statue of Our Lady of Aparecida. This statue, thought to have been found in the Paraíba River in October 1717, is made of clay and measures 40 centimeters in height. The dark colour was produced by the years of exposure to candles and lamps around the altar. In 1978 it was attacked and reduced to hundreds of fragments which were meticulously put back together by specialists from the São Paulo Museum of Art.

Aparecida was the source of a proposal endorsed by Pope Francis in 2020 to establish a collaborative ministry among the local churches of the various South American countries in the Amazon basin, with differentiated priorities.

The city has other attractions besides religious buildings, such as a theme park, aquarium, and museums. Among local events are a Festa de Nossa Senhora Aparecida, on 12 October, which attracts more than 100,000 faithful, and a Festa de São Benedito with performances by several traditional groups.

References

External links

 
  Cidade de Aparecida
  Guia Vale do Paraíba - O que fazer em Aparecida

Municipalities in São Paulo (state)
Populated places established in 1928